"Sad Tango" marks Rain's (or ピ in Japanese) debut single throughout Japan. The single experiments with Latin style melodies tied with modern RNB beats. The single was released on January 25, 2006 and entered the official Japanese Music Charts (Oricon) at number fourteen. The single was released in two formats, a CD Single and a CD/DVD single, and included the R&B ballad Slowly as a b-side.

Music video
In the music video for Sad Tango, we follow the mysterious, dark figure of Rain entering a parking lot on his motorcycle after a white car. This is revealed to be the car of a young woman, who Rain follows into a club-like arena. The scene swiftly changes to a lit-up dance floor, on which Rain and his dancers are on. The music begins, and Rain is soon singing. The video alternates between Rain on the dance floor and him following the mysterious girl through the club.

Track listing
CD Single
 Sad Tango 
 Slowly
 Sad Tango [Instrumental Version]
 Slowly [Instrumental Version]

DVD Single Disc 1
 Sad Tango - Music Video
 Making of Sad Tango

DVD Single Disc 2
 Sad Tango
 Slowly
 Sad Tango [Instrumental Version]
 Slowly [Instrumental Version]

Charts

Sales: 25,748

References

External links
 Rain - Official English website 

2006 singles
Rain (entertainer) songs
Japanese-language songs
2006 songs
King Records (Japan) singles